Eucalyptus triflora, commonly known as Pigeon House ash or three-flowered ash, is a species of small tree that is endemic to a small area of New South Wales. It has smooth bark, lance-shaped or curved adult leaves, flower buds usually in groups of three, white flowers and urn-shaped fruit.

Description
It has smooth white to cream-coloured bark with insect scribbles, sometimes with rough dark grey bark on the base of older trees. Flowering occurs from December to March and the flowers are white.

Taxonomy and naming
Pigeon House ash was first formally described in 1907 by Joseph Maiden in his book The Forest Flora of New South Wales from specimens collected from the top of Pigeon House Mountain by Richard Hind Cambage. Maiden gave it the name Eucalyptus virgata var. triflora. In 1934,William Blakely raised the variety to species status as Eucalyptus triflora. The specific epithet (triflora) is from Latin words meaning "three" and "flowered".

Distribution and habitt
Eucalyptus triflora usually grows between sandstone boulders in higher areas, sometimes in heath, open forest or woodland. It is found in a few disjunct areas from near Nerriga to Pigeon House Mountain, in parts of the Deua National Park and near Yalwal.

References

triflora
Myrtales of Australia
Flora of New South Wales
Trees of Australia
Plants described in 1907